William Whitfield II (May 20, 1715 in Chowan County, North Carolina – March 31, 1795 in Bertie County, North Carolina) was a Captain of the 6th Virginia Regiment during the American Revolutionary War and a planter. He purchased Seven Springs, North Carolina from Buckskin Williams, the father of Benjamin Williams, the Governor of North Carolina.

Family
He was a son of William Whitfield I, the patriarch of the Whitfield family of the United States. He married Rachel Bryan. James Whitfield (1791-1875), the 18th Governor of Mississippi, 1851-52 was his grandnephew, while Henry L. Whitfield (1868 -1927), the 41st Governor of Mississippi, was his great-great-great grandson.

Background
His sons, Needham Whitfield and William Whitfield III were in the Battle of Moore's Creek Bridge during the revolutionary war. He was a former clerk to Colonel Caswell and the other a private in the Light Horse Cavalry, taking prisoner General McDonald, who was the Commander of the Tories.

William was a Dobbs County member to the 1761 and 1762 North Carolina General Assembly held in Wilmington. In 1779 he was a member of Governor Richard Caswell's Council held in New Berne, and a Justice of Peace for Johnston County, North Carolina. He was later a Colonel.

Notes

Sources
William Whitfield profile at The National Society of the Colonial Dames of America

Continental Army officers from Virginia
People from Chowan County, North Carolina
People from Wayne County, North Carolina
1715 births
1795 deaths
Whitfield family